Macau or Macao, officially the Macao Special Administrative Region of the People's Republic of China (MSAR), is a city and special administrative region of China in the western Pearl River Delta by the South China Sea.

Formerly a Portuguese colony, the territory of Portuguese Macau was first leased to Portugal as a trading post by the Ming dynasty in 1557. Portugal paid an annual rent and administered the territory under Chinese sovereignty until 1887. Portugal later gained perpetual colonial rights in the Sino-Portuguese Treaty of Peking. The colony remained under Portuguese rule until 1999, when it was transferred to China. Macau is a special administrative region of China, which maintains separate governing and economic systems from those of mainland China under the principle of "one country, two systems". The unique blend of Portuguese and Chinese architecture in the city's historic centre led to its inscription on the UNESCO World Heritage List in 2005.

Originally a sparsely populated collection of coastal islands, Macau, often referred to as the "Las Vegas of the East", has become a major resort city and a top destination for gambling tourism, with a gambling industry seven times larger than that of Las Vegas. The city has one of the highest per capita incomes in the world, US$43,770 in 2021, and its GDP per capita by purchasing power parity is one of the highest in the world. It has a very high Human Development Index, as calculated by the Macau government, and the fourth-highest life expectancy in the world. The territory is highly urbanised; two-thirds of the total land area is built on land reclaimed from the sea.

Etymology 

The first known written record of the name "Macau", rendered as "A Ma Gang", is found in a letter dated 20 November 1555. The local inhabitants believed that the sea goddess Matsu (alternatively called A-Ma) had blessed and protected the harbour and called the waters around A-Ma Temple using her name. When Portuguese explorers first arrived in the area and asked for the place name, the locals thought they were asking about the temple and told them it was "Ma Kok". The earliest Portuguese spelling for this was Amaquão. Multiple variations were used until Amacão / Amacao and Macão / Macao became common during the 17th century. The 1911 reform of Portuguese orthography standardised the spelling Macau; however, the use of Macao persisted in English and other European languages.

The Macau Peninsula had many names in Chinese, including Jing'ao, Haojing, and Haojing'ao. The islands Taipa, Coloane, and Hengqin were collectively called Shizimen. These names would later become Aomen, Oumún in Cantonese and translating as "bay gate" or "port gate", to refer to the whole territory.

History 

During the Qin dynasty (221–206 BC), the region was under the jurisdiction of Panyu County, Nanhai Prefecture of the province of Guangdong. The region is first known to have been settled during the Han dynasty. It was administratively part of Dongguan Prefecture in the Jin dynasty (266–420 AD), and alternated under the control of Nanhai and Dongguan in later dynasties. In 1152, during the Song dynasty (960–1279 AD), it was under the jurisdiction of the new Xiangshan County. In 1277, approximately 50,000 refugees fleeing the Mongol conquest of China settled in the coastal area.

Macau did not develop as a major settlement until the Portuguese arrived in the 16th century. The first European visitor to reach China by sea was the explorer Jorge Álvares, who arrived in 1513. Merchants first established a trading post in Hong Kong waters at Tamão (present-day Tuen Mun), beginning regular trade with nearby settlements in southern China. Military clashes between the Ming and Portuguese navies followed the expulsion of the Tamão traders in 1521. Despite the trade ban, Portuguese merchants continued to attempt to settle on other parts of the Pearl River estuary, finally settling on Macau. In their first attempts at obtaining trading posts by force, the Portuguese were defeated by the Ming Chinese at the Battle of Tunmen in Tamão (or Tuen Mun) in 1521, where the Portuguese lost two ships; the Battle of Sincouwaan in Lantau Island where the Portuguese also lost two ships; in Shuangyu in 1548, where several Portuguese were captured; and near the Dongshan Peninsula in 1549, where two Portuguese junks and Galeote Pereira were captured. During these battles the Ming Chinese captured weapons from the defeated Portuguese which they then reverse engineered and mass-produced in China such as matchlock musket arquebuses which they named bird guns and Breech loading swivel guns which they named as Folangji (Frankish) cannon because the Portuguese were known to the Chinese under the name of Franks at this time. The Portuguese later returned to China peacefully and presented themselves under the name Portuguese instead of Franks in the Luso-Chinese agreement (1554) and rented Macau as a trading post from China by paying annual lease of hundreds of silver taels to Ming China. Luso-Canton trade relations were formally reestablished in 1554 and Portugal soon after acquired a permanent lease for Macau in 1557, agreeing to pay 500 taels of silver as annual land rent.

The initially small population of Portuguese merchants rapidly became a growing city. The Roman Catholic Diocese of Macau was created in 1576, and by 1583, the Senate had been established to handle municipal affairs for the growing settlement. Macau was at the peak of its prosperity as a major entrepôt during the late 16th century, providing a crucial connection in exporting Chinese silk to Japan during the Nanban trade period. Although the Portuguese were initially prohibited from fortifying Macau or stockpiling weapons, the Fortaleza do Monte was constructed in response to frequent Dutch naval incursions. The Dutch attempted to take the city in the 1622 Battle of Macau, but were repelled successfully by the Portuguese. Macau entered a period of decline in the 1640s following a series of catastrophic events for the burgeoning colony: Portuguese access to trade routes was irreparably severed when Japan halted trade in 1639, Portugal revolted against Spain in 1640, and Malacca fell to the Dutch in 1641.

Maritime trade with China was banned in 1644 following the Qing conquest under the Haijin policies and limited only to Macau on a lesser scale while the new dynasty focused on eliminating surviving Ming loyalists. While the Kangxi Emperor lifted the prohibition in 1684, China again restricted trade under the Canton System in 1757. Foreign ships were required to first stop at Macau before further proceeding to Canton. Qing authorities exercised a much greater role in governing the territory during this period; Chinese residents were subject to Qing courts and new construction had to be approved by the resident mandarin beginning in the 1740s. As the opium trade became more lucrative during the 18th century, Macau again became an important stopping point en route to China.

Following the First Opium War and the establishment of Hong Kong, Macau lost its role as a major port. Firecracker and incense production, as well as tea and tobacco processing, were vital industries in the colony during this time. Portugal was able to capitalise on China's postwar weakness and assert its sovereignty; the Governor of Macau began refusing to pay China annual land rent for the colony in the 1840s, and annexed Taipa and Coloane, in 1851 and 1864 respectively. Portugal also occupied nearby Lapa and Montanha, but these would be returned to China by 1887, when perpetual occupation rights over Macau were formalised in the Sino-Portuguese Treaty of Peking. This agreement also prohibited Portugal from ceding Macau without Chinese approval. Despite occasional conflict between Cantonese authorities and the colonial government, Macau's status remained unchanged through the republican revolutions of both Portugal in 1910 and China in 1911. The Kuomintang further affirmed Portuguese jurisdiction in Macau when the Treaty of Peking was renegotiated in 1928.

During the Second World War, the Empire of Japan did not occupy the colony and generally respected Portuguese neutrality in Macau. However, after Japanese troops captured a British cargo ship in Macau waters in 1943, Japan installed a group of government "advisors" as an alternative to military occupation. The territory largely avoided military action during the war except in 1945, when the United States ordered air raids on Macau after learning that the colonial government was preparing to sell aviation fuel to Japan. Portugal was later given over US$20 million in compensation for the damage in 1950.

Refugees from mainland China swelled the population as they fled from the Chinese Civil War. Access to a large workforce enabled Macau's economy to grow as the colony expanded its clothing and textiles manufacturing industry, developed its tourism industry, and legalised casino gaming. However, at the height of the Cultural Revolution, residents dissatisfied with the colonial administration rioted in the 1966 12-3 incident, in which 8 people were killed and over 200 were injured. Portugal lost full control over the colony afterwards, and agreed to cooperate with the Chinese Communist Party in exchange for continued administration of Macau.

Following the 1974 Carnation Revolution, Portugal formally relinquished Macau as an overseas province and acknowledged it as a "Chinese territory under Portuguese administration". After China first concluded arrangements on Hong Kong's future with the United Kingdom, it entered negotiations with Portugal over Macau in 1986. They were concluded with the signing of the 1987 Joint Declaration on the Question of Macau, in which Portugal agreed to transfer the colony in 1999 and China would guarantee Macau's political and economic systems for 50 years after the transfer. In the waning years of colonial rule, Macau rapidly urbanised and constructed large-scale infrastructure projects, including the Macau International Airport and a new container port. Macau was transferred to China on 20 December 1999, after 442 years of Portuguese rule.

Following the transfer, Macau liberalised its casino industry (which previously operated under a government-licensed monopoly) to allow foreign investors, starting a new period of economic development. The regional economy grew by a double-digit annual growth rate from 2002 to 2014, making Macau one of the richest economies in the world on a per capita basis. Political debates have centred on the region's jurisdictional independence and the central government's adherence of "one country, two systems". While issues such as national security legislation have been controversial, Macanese residents generally have high levels of trust in the government.
Kwong and Wong explain this by comparing Macau to Hong Kong: "The case of Macau shows that the very small size of a ‘microstate’ helps central authorities to exercise political control, stifle political pluralism, and monopolize opinions, all of which strengthen regime persistence."

Government and politics 

Macau is a special administrative region of China, with executive, legislative, and judicial powers devolved from the national government. The Sino-Portuguese Joint Declaration provided for economic and administrative continuity through the transfer of sovereignty, resulting in an executive-led governing system largely inherited from the territory's history as a Portuguese colony. Under these terms and the "one country, two systems" principle, the Basic Law of Macao is the regional constitution. Because negotiations for the Joint Declaration and Basic Law began after transitional arrangements for Hong Kong were made, Macau's structure of government is very similar to Hong Kong's.

The regional government is composed of three branches:
 Executive: The Chief Executive is responsible for enforcing regional law, can force reconsideration of legislation, and appoints Executive Council members, a portion of the legislature, and principal officials. Acting with the Executive Council, the Chief Executive can propose new bills, issue subordinate legislation, and has authority to dissolve the legislature.
 Legislature: The unicameral Legislative Assembly enacts regional law, approves budgets, and has the power to impeach a sitting Chief Executive.
 Judiciary: The Court of Final Appeal and lower courts, whose judges are appointed by the Chief Executive on the advice of a recommendation commission, interpret laws and overturn those inconsistent with the Basic Law.

The Chief Executive is the head of government, and serves for a maximum of two five-year terms. The State Council (led by the Premier of China) appoints the Chief Executive after nomination by the Election Committee, which is composed of 400 business, community, and government leaders.

The Legislative Assembly has 33 members, each serving a four-year term: 14 are directly elected, 12 indirectly elected, and 7 appointed by the Chief Executive. Indirectly elected assemblymen are selected from limited electorates representing sectors of the economy or special interest groups. All directly elected members are chosen with proportional representation.

Twelve political parties had representatives elected to the Legislative Assembly in the 2017 election. These parties have aligned themselves into two ideological groups: the pro-establishment (the current government) and pro-democracy camps. Macau is represented in the National People's Congress by 12 deputies chosen through an electoral college, and 29 delegates in the Chinese People's Political Consultative Conference appointed by the central government.

Chinese national law does not generally apply in the region, and Macau is treated as a separate jurisdiction. Its judicial system is based on Portuguese civil law, continuing the legal tradition established during colonial rule. Interpretative and amending power over the Basic Law and jurisdiction over acts of state lie with the central authority, however, making regional courts ultimately subordinate to the mainland's socialist civil law system. Decisions made by the Standing Committee of the National People's Congress can also override territorial judicial processes. In 2021, after similar actions were taken in Hong Kong following the protests associated with the Anti-Extradition Law Amendment Bill Movement, 21 candidates running for office in the territorial elections were disqualified as a result of allegedly failing to support the Basic Law, although no specific violations were noted by the territory's electoral commission.

The territory's jurisdictional independence is most apparent in its immigration and taxation policies. The Identification Department issues passports for permanent residents which differ from those issued by the mainland or Hong Kong, and the region maintains a regulated border with the rest of the country. All travellers between Macau and China and Hong Kong must pass border controls, regardless of nationality. Chinese citizens resident in mainland China do not have the right of abode in Macau and are subject to immigration controls. Public finances are handled separately from the national government, and taxes levied in Macau do not fund the central authority.

The Macao Garrison is responsible for the region's defence. Although the Chairman of the Central Military Commission is supreme commander of the armed forces, the regional government may request assistance from the garrison. Macau residents are not required to perform military service and the law also has no provision for local enlistment, so its defence force is composed entirely of nonresidents.

The State Council and the Ministry of Foreign Affairs handle diplomatic matters, but Macau retains the ability to maintain separate economic and cultural relations with foreign nations. The territory negotiates its own trade agreements and actively participates in supranational organisations, including agencies of the World Trade Organization and United Nations. The regional government maintains trade offices in Greater China and other nations.

Lusophonia membership
Macau is not a member of the Community of Portuguese Language Countries, despite Portuguese being one of its official languages. This is due to it not being a sovereign nation, but a subnational division of China. In 2006, during the II Ministerial meeting between China and Portuguese Speaking Countries, the CPLP Executive Secretary and Deputy ambassador Tadeu Soares invited the Chief Executive of the Government of the Macau Special Administrative Region, Edmund Ho, to request the Associate Observer status for Macau. The Government of Macau has yet to make this request. In 2016, Murade Murargy, then executive secretary of CPLP said in an interview that Macau's membership is a complicated question, since like the Galicia region in Spain, it is not an independent country, but only a part of China. However, the Instituto Internacional de Macau and the University of São José are Consultative Observers of the CPLP.

Administrative divisions 

The territory is divided into seven parishes. Cotai, a major area developed on reclaimed land between Taipa and Coloane, and areas of the Macau New Urban Zone do not have defined parishes. Historically, the parishes belonged to one of two municipalities (the Municipality of Macau or the Municipality of Ilhas) that were responsible for administering municipal services. The municipalities were abolished in 2001 and superseded by the Civic and Municipal Affairs Bureau in providing local services.

Geography 

It is surrounded by the South China Sea in the east and south, and neighbours the Guangdong city of Zhuhai to the west and north. The territory consists of Macau Peninsula, Taipa, and Coloane. A  parcel of land in neighbouring Hengqin island that hosts the University of Macau also falls under the regional government's jurisdiction.

Urban development is concentrated on peninsular Macau, where most of the population lives. The peninsula was originally a separate island with hilly terrain, which gradually became a tombolo as a connecting sandbar formed over time. Both natural sedimentation and land reclamation expanded the area enough to support urban growth.

Cotai, the area of reclaimed land connecting Taipa and Coloane, contains many of the newer casinos and resorts established after 1999. The region's jurisdiction over the surrounding sea was greatly expanded in 2015, when it was granted an additional  of maritime territory by the State Council. Further reclamation is currently underway to develop parts of the Macau New Urban Zone. The territory also has control over part of an artificial island to maintain a border checkpoint for the Hong Kong–Zhuhai–Macau Bridge.

Climate 
Despite being located south of the Tropic of Cancer, Macau has a humid subtropical climate (Köppen Cwa), characteristic of southern China. The territory is dual season dominant – summer (May to September) and winter (November to February) are the longest seasons, while spring (March and April) and autumn (October) are relatively brief periods. The summer monsoon brings warm and humid air from the sea, with the most frequent rainfall occurring during the season. Typhoons also occur most often then, bringing significant spikes in rainfall. During the winter, northern winds from the continent bring dry air and much less rainfall.

Demographics 

The Statistics and Census Service estimated Macau's population at 667,400 at the end of 2018. With a population density of 21,340 people per square kilometre, Macau is the most densely populated region in the world. The overwhelming majority (88.7 per cent) are Chinese, many of whom originate from Guangdong (31.9 per cent) or Fujian (5.9 per cent). The remaining 11.6 per cent are non ethnic Chinese minorities, primarily Filipinos (4.6 per cent), Vietnamese (2.4 per cent), and Portuguese (1.8 per cent). Several thousand residents are of Macanese heritage, native-born multiracial people with mixed Portuguese ancestry. Of the total population (excluding migrants), 49.4 per cent were born in Macau, followed by 43.1 per cent in Mainland China. A large portion of the population are Portuguese citizens, a legacy of colonial rule; at the time of the transfer of sovereignty in 1999, 107,000 residents held Portuguese passports.

The predominant language is Cantonese, a variety of Chinese originating in Guangdong. It is spoken by 87.5 per cent of the population, 80.1 per cent as a first language and 7.5 per cent as a second language. Only 2.3 per cent can speak Portuguese, the other official language; 0.7 per cent are native speakers, and 1.6 per cent use it as a second language. Increased immigration from mainland China in recent years has added to the number of Mandarin speakers, making up about half of the population (50.4 per cent); 5.5 per cent are native speakers and 44.9 per cent are second language speakers. Traditional Chinese characters are used in writing, rather than the simplified characters used on the mainland. English is considered an additional working language and is spoken by over a quarter of the population (27.5 per cent); 2.8 per cent are native speakers, and 24.7 per cent speak English as a second language. Macanese Patois, a local creole generally known as Patuá, is now spoken only by a few in the older Macanese community.

According to the Government Information Bureau, 80 per cent of the population practices Buddhism, 6.7 per cent follow Christianity and 13.7 per cent follow other religion. Folk practices are also common among the citizens. According to Pew Research Center, Chinese folk religions have the most adherents (58.9 per cent) and are followed by Buddhism (17.3 per cent) and Christianity (7.2 per cent), while 15.4 per cent of the population profess no religious affiliation at all. Small minorities adhering to other religions (less than 1 per cent), including Hinduism, Judaism, and Islam, are also resident in Macau.

Life expectancy in Macau was 81.6 years for males and 87.7 years for females in 2018, the fourth highest in the world. Cancer, heart disease, and respiratory disease are the territory's three leading causes of death. Most government-provided healthcare services are free of charge, though alternative treatment is also heavily subsidised.

Migrant workers living in Macau account for over 25 per cent of the entire workforce. They largely work in lower wage sectors of the economy, including construction, hotels, and restaurants. As a growing proportion of local residents take up employment in the gaming industry, the disparity in income between local and migrant workers has been increasing. Rising living costs have also pushed a large portion of nonresident workers to live in Zhuhai.

Economy 

Macau has a capitalist service economy largely based on casino gaming and tourism. It is the world's 83rd-largest economy, with a nominal GDP of approximately MOP433 billion (US$53.9 billion). Although Macau has one of the highest per capita GDPs, the territory also has a high level of wealth disparity. Macau's gaming industry is the largest in the world, generating over MOP195 billion (US$24 billion) in revenue and about seven times larger than that of Las Vegas. Macau's gambling revenue was $37 billion in 2018.

The regional economy is heavily reliant on casino gaming. The vast majority of government funding (79.6 per cent of total tax revenue) comes from gaming. Gambling as a share of GDP peaked in 2013 at over 60 per cent, and continues to account for 49.1 per cent of total economic output. The vast majority of casino patrons are tourists from mainland China, making up 68 per cent of all visitors. Casino gaming is illegal in both the mainland and Hong Kong, giving Macau a legal monopoly on the industry in China. Revenue from Chinese high rollers has been falling and was forecast to fall as much as 10% more in 2019. Economic uncertainty may account for some of the drop, but alternate Asian gambling venues do as well. For example, Chinese visitors to the Philippines more than doubled between 2015 and 2018, since the City of Dreams casino opened in Manila.

Casino gambling was legalised in 1962 and the gaming industry initially operated under a government-licensed monopoly granted to the Sociedade de Turismo e Diversões de Macau. This licence was renegotiated and renewed several times before ending in 2002 after 40 years. The government then allowed open bidding for casino licences to attract foreign investors. Along with an easing of travel restrictions on mainland Chinese visitors, this triggered a period of rapid economic growth; from 1999 to 2016, Macau's gross domestic product multiplied by 7 and the unemployment rate dropped from 6.3 to 1.9 per cent. The Sands Macao, Wynn Macau, MGM Macau, and Venetian Macau were all opened during the first decade after liberalisation of casino concessions. Casinos employ about 24 per cent of the total workforce in the region. "Increased competition from casinos popping up across Asia to lure away Chinese high rollers and tourists" in Singapore, South Korea, Japan, Nepal, the Philippines, Australia, Vietnam and the Russian Far East led in 2019 to the lowest revenues in three years.

Export-oriented manufacturing previously contributed to a much larger share of economic output, peaking at 36.9 per cent of GDP in 1985 and falling to less than 1 per cent in 2017. The bulk of these exports were cotton textiles and apparel, but also included toys and electronics. At the transfer of sovereignty in 1999, manufacturing, financial services, construction and real estate, and gaming were the four largest sectors of the economy. Macau's shift to an economic model entirely dependent on gaming caused concern over its overexposure to a single sector, prompting the regional government to attempt re-diversifying its economy.

The government traditionally had a non-interventionist role in the economy and taxes corporations at very low rates. Post-handover administrations have generally been more involved in enhancing social welfare to counter the cyclical nature of the gaming industry. Economic growth has been attributed in large part to the high number of mainlander visits to Macau, and the central government exercises a role in guiding casino business growth through its control of the flow of tourists. The Closer Economic Partnership Arrangement formalised a policy of free trade between Macau and mainland China, with each jurisdiction pledging to remove remaining obstacles to trade and cross-boundary investment.

Due to a lack of available land for farming, agriculture is not significant in the economy. Food is exclusively imported to Macau and almost all foreign goods are transshipped through Hong Kong.

Infrastructure

Transport 

Automobiles drive on the left (unlike in both mainland China and Portugal), due to historical influence of the Portuguese Empire. Vehicle traffic is extremely congested, especially in the oldest part of the city, where streets are the narrowest. Public bus services operate over 80 routes, supplemented by free hotel shuttle buses that also run routes to popular tourist attractions and downtown locations. About 1,500 black taxicabs are licensed in the territory. The Hong Kong–Zhuhai–Macau Bridge, opened in 2018, provides a direct link with the eastern side of the Pearl River estuary. Cross-boundary traffic to mainland China may also pass through border checkpoints at the Portas do Cerco, Lótus Bridge, and Qingmao Port.

Macau International Airport serves over 8 million passengers each year and is the primary hub for local flag carrier Air Macau. Ferry services to Hong Kong and mainland China operate out of ferry terminals such as Taipa Ferry Terminal. Daily helicopter service is also available to Hong Kong and Shenzhen. Phase 1 of the territory's first rail network, the Macau Light Rapid Transit, began operations in December 2019. The Taipa line connects 11 metro stations throughout Taipa and Cotai.

Healthcare 

Macau is served by one major public hospital, the Hospital Conde S. Januário, and one major private hospital, the Kiang Wu Hospital, both located in Macau Peninsula, as well as a university associated hospital called Macau University of Science and Technology Hospital in Cotai. In addition to hospitals, Macau also has numerous health centres providing free basic medical care to residents. Consultation in traditional Chinese medicine is also available.

None of the Macau hospitals are independently assessed through international healthcare accreditation. A Western-style medical school was opened in Macau in 2019 by the Macau University of Science and Technology, with an annual intake of 50 students. Local nurses are trained at the Macao Polytechnic University and the Kiang Wu Nursing College of Macau. Currently there are no training courses in midwifery in Macau. A study by the University of Macau, commissioned by the Macau SAR government, concluded that Macau is too small to have its own medical specialist training centre.

The Fire Services Bureau is responsible for ambulance service (Ambulância de Macau). The Macau Red Cross also operates ambulances (Toyota HiAce vans) for emergency and non-emergencies to local hospitals with volunteer staff. The organisation has a total of 739 uniformed firefighters and paramedics serving from 7 stations in Macau.

The Health Bureau in Macau is mainly responsible for coordinating the activities between the public and private organisations in the area of public health, and assure the health of citizens through specialised and primary health care services, as well as disease prevention and health promotion. The Macau Centre for Disease Control and Prevention was established in 2001, which monitors the operation of hospitals, health centres, and the blood transfusion centre in Macau. It also handles the organisation of care and prevention of diseases affecting the population, sets guidelines for hospitals and private healthcare providers, and issues licenses.

 Macau healthcare authorities send patients to Queen Mary Hospital in Hong Kong in instances where the local Macau hospitals are not equipped to deal with their scenarios, and many Macau residents intentionally seek healthcare in Hong Kong because they place more trust in Hong Kong doctors than in Mainland-trained doctors operating in Macau.

Education 

Education in Macau does not have a single centralised set of standards or curriculum. Individual schools follow different educational models, including Chinese, Portuguese, Hong Kong, and British systems. Children are required to attend school from the age of five until completion of lower secondary school, or at age 15. Of residents aged 3 and older, 69 per cent completed lower secondary education, 49 per cent graduated from an upper secondary school, 21 per cent earned a bachelor's degree or higher. Mandatory education has contributed to an adult literacy rate of 96.5 per cent. While lower than that of other developed economies, the rate is due to the influx of refugees from mainland China during the post-war colonial era. Much of the elderly population were not formally educated due to war and poverty.

Most schools in the territory are private institutions. Out of the 77 non-tertiary schools, 10 are public and the other 67 are privately run. The Roman Catholic Diocese of Macau maintains an important position in territorial education, managing 27 primary and secondary schools. The government provides 15 years of free education for all residents enrolled in publicly run schools, and subsidises tuition for students in private schools. Students at the secondary school level studying in neighbouring areas of Guangdong are also eligible for tuition subsidies.

The vast majority of schools use Cantonese as the medium of instruction, with written education in Chinese and compulsory classes in Mandarin. A minority of private schools use English or Portuguese as the primary teaching language. Portuguese-Chinese schools mainly use Chinese, but additionally require mandatory Portuguese-language classes as part of their curriculum.

Macau has ten universities and tertiary education institutes. The University of Macau, founded in 1981, is the territory's only public comprehensive university. The Kiang Wu Nursing College of Macau is the oldest higher institute, specialising in educating future nursing staff for the college's parent hospital. The University of Saint Joseph, Macau University of Science and Technology, and the City University of Macau were all established in subsequent years. Five other institutes specialise in specific vocations or provide continuing education.

Culture 

The mixing of Chinese and Portuguese culture and religious traditions for more than four centuries has left Macau with an inimitable collection of holidays, festivals and events. The biggest event of the year is the Macau Grand Prix each November, when the main streets of the Macau Peninsula are converted to a racetrack bearing similarities with the Monaco Grand Prix. Other annual events include Macau Arts festival in March, the International Fireworks Display Contest in September, the International Music festival in October and/or November, and the Macau International Marathon in December.

The Lunar Chinese New Year is the most important traditional festival, and celebration normally takes place in late January or early February. The Pou Tai Un Temple in Taipa is the place for the Feast of Tou Tei, the Earth god, in February. The Procession of the Passion of Our Lord is a well-known Roman Catholic rite and journey, which travels from Saint Austin's Church to the cathedral, also taking place in February.

The A-Ma Temple, which honours the Goddess Matsu, is in full swing in April with many worshipers celebrating the A-Ma festival. In May, it is common to see dancing dragons at the Feast of the Drunken Dragon and twinkling-clean Buddhas at the Feast of the Bathing of Lord Buddha. In Coloane Village, the Taoist god Tam Kong is also honoured on the same day. Dragon Boat Festival is brought into play on Nam Van Lake in June and Hungry Ghosts' festival, in late August and/or early September every year. All events and festivities of the year end with Winter Solstice in December.

Macau preserves many historical properties in the urban area. Its historic centre, which includes some twenty-five historic locations, was officially listed as a World Heritage Site by UNESCO on 15 July 2005 during the 29th session of the World Heritage Committee, held in Durban, South Africa.
However, the Macao government is criticised for ignoring the conservation of heritage in urban planning. In 2007, local residents of Macao wrote a letter to UNESCO complaining about construction projects around world heritage Guia Lighthouse (Focal height ), including the headquarter of the Liaison Office. UNESCO then issued a warning to the Macau government, which led former Chief Executive Edmund Ho to sign a notice regulating height restrictions on buildings around the site. In 2015, the New Macau Association submitted a report to UNESCO claiming that the government had failed to protect Macao's cultural heritage against threats by urban development projects. One of the main examples of the report is that the headquarter of the Liaison Office of the Central People's Government, which is located on the Guia foothill and obstructs the view of the Guia Fortress (one of the world heritages symbols of Macao). One year later, Roni Amelan, a spokesman from UNESCO Press service, said that the UNESCO has asked China for information and is still waiting for a reply. In 2016, the Macau government approved an -tall construction limit for the residential project, which reportedly goes against the city's regulations on the height of buildings around world heritage site Guia Lighthouse.

Cuisine 

Food in Macau is mainly based on both Cantonese and Portuguese cuisine, drawing influences from Indian and Malay dishes as well, reflecting a unique cultural and culinary blend after centuries of colonial rule. Portuguese recipes were adapted to use local ingredients, such as fresh seafood, turmeric, coconut milk, and adzuki beans. These adaptations produced Macanese variations of traditional Portuguese dishes including caldo verde, minchee, and cozido à portuguesa. While many restaurants claim to serve traditional Portuguese or Macanese dishes, most serve a mix of Cantonese-Portuguese fusion cuisine. Galinha à portuguesa is an example of a Chinese dish that draws from Macanese influences, but is not part of Macanese cuisine. Cha chaan teng, a type of fast casual diner originating in Hong Kong that serves that region's interpretation of Western food, are also prevalent in Macau. Pastel de nata, pork chop buns, and almond biscuits are popular street food items.

Sports 

Despite its small area, Macau is home to a variety of sports and recreational facilities that have hosted a number of major international sporting events, including the 2005 East Asian Games, the 2006 Lusophony Games, and the 2007 Asian Indoor Games.

The territory regularly hosts the Macau Grand Prix, one of the most significant annual motorsport competitions that uses city streets as the racetrack. It is the only street circuit that hosts Formula Three, touring car, and motorcycle races in the same event. The Guia Circuit, with narrow corner clearance and a winding path, is considered an extremely challenging course and a serious milestone for prospective Formula One racers.

Macau represents itself separately from mainland China with its own sports teams in international competitions. The territory maintains its own National Olympic Committee, but does not compete in the Olympic Games. International Olympic Committee rules specify that new NOCs can only be admitted if they represent sovereign states (Hong Kong has participated in the Olympics since before the regulation change in 1996).

Twin towns and sister cities 
Macau has six sister cities, listed chronologically by year joined:

  Lisbon, Portugal (1982)
  Porto, Portugal (1997)
  Linköping, Sweden (1997)
  Coimbra, Portugal (1998)
  São Paulo, Brazil (2000)
  Praia, Cape Verde (2007)

Additionally, Macau has other cultural agreements with the following cities:
  Brussels, Belgium (1991)
  San Francisco, United States (2001)
  Da Nang, Vietnam (2006)
  Phuket, Thailand (2018)

Union of Luso-Afro-Americo-Asiatic Capital Cities 
Macau is part of the Union of Luso-Afro-Americo-Asiatic Capital Cities from 28 June 1985, establishing brotherly relations with the following cities:

  Bissau, Guinea-Bissau
  Dili, East Timor
  Lisbon, Portugal
  Luanda, Angola
  Maputo, Mozambique
  Panaji (Panjim), India
  Praia, Cape Verde
  Rio de Janeiro, Brazil
  São Tomé, São Tomé and Príncipe

See also 

 Foreign relations of Macau
 Outline of Macau
 Index of Macau-related articles
 Cuiheng New Area
 Elsie Ao Ieong

Notes

References

Citations

Sources

Government reports

Academic publications

Legislation

Print

News articles

External links 

 Macau. The World Factbook. Central Intelligence Agency.
 Macau from BBC News
 Government
 Gov.MO Macau SAR Government Portal
 Macao Government Tourism Office
 Macau SAR News
 Trade
 World Bank Summary Trade Statistics Macao
 Maps
 
 

 
People's Republic of China
1557 establishments in Asia
Former colonies in Asia
Former Portuguese colonies
Pearl River Delta
Populated coastal places in China
Port cities and towns in China
Chinese-speaking countries and territories
Portuguese-speaking countries and territories
Special administrative regions of China
States and territories established in 1999
South China
South China Sea